Qorban Qelich Molla (also Romanized as Qorbān Qelīch Mollā; also known as Qorbānqelīch) is a village in Kerend Rural District, Dashli Borun District, Gonbad-e Qabus County, Golestan Province, Iran. At the 2006 census, its population was 80, in 14 families.

References 

Populated places in Gonbad-e Kavus County